Streptomyces yunnanensis is a bacterium species from the genus of Streptomyces which has been isolated from soil from a suburb of Kunming in the Yunnan Province in China.

See also 
 List of Streptomyces species

References

Further reading

External links
Type strain of Streptomyces yunnanensis at BacDive – the Bacterial Diversity Metadatabase	

yunnanensis
Bacteria described in 2003